Pachyrhachis (from  , 'thick' and  , 'spine') is an extinct genus of snake with well developed hind legs known from fossils discovered in Ein Yabrud, near Ramallah, in the central West Bank. Pachyrhachis appears to have been an ancient marine snake; the fossils occur in a marine limestone deposit, and the thickened bone of the ribs and vertebrae would have functioned as ballast to decrease the buoyancy of the animal, allowing it to dive beneath the ancient Cretaceous seas that it once inhabited.

Pachyrhachis is one of three genera of Cenomanian snakes with hindlimbs. Although many modern pythons and boas still retain remnants of legs, in the form of small spurs, the tiny legs of Pachyrhachis included a hip, knee, and ankle joint. Pachyrhachis was originally described by Haas (1979, 1980) who noted it had a puzzling melange of snake and lizard features; its status as an early snake was later confirmed (Caldwell and Lee 1997).

The position of Pachyrhachis within snakes has been debated (e.g. Lee and Scanlon 2002; Rieppel et al. 2003). Pachyrhachis is among the oldest known snakes and retains well-developed hind limbs, suggesting it represented a transitional form linking snakes to marine lizards (Lee and Scanlon 2002), though other studies place Pachyrhachis within the modern snake radiation Macrostomata (Zaher & Rieppel, 1999).

See also

Other known fossil snakes with legs:
Eupodophis
Haasiophis
Najash
Tetrapodophis

References

 Caldwell, M. W. & Lee, M. S. Y.  (1997).  A snake with legs from the marine Cretaceous of the Middle East.  Nature 386: 705–709.
 Haas, G. 1979  On a new snakelike reptile from the Lower Cenomanian of Ein Jabrud, near Jerusalem. Bull. Mus. Nat. Hist. Nat., Paris, Ser. 4, 1, 51–64.
 Haas, G. 1980   Pachyrhachis problematicus Haas, snakelike reptile from the Lower Cenomanian: ventral view of the skull. Bull. Mus. Nat. Hist. Nat., Paris, Ser. 4, 2:87-104.
 Haas, G. 1980  Remarks on a new ophiomorph reptile from the Lower Cenomanian of Ein Jabrud, Israel.  In Aspects of Vertebrate History, in Honor of E.H. Colbert (ed. L.L. Jacobs), pp. 177–102.  Flagstaff AZ: Museum of Northern Arizona Press.
 Lee, M.S.Y. and Caldwell, M.W. 1998.  Anatomy and relationships of Pachyrhachis, a primitive snake with hindlimbs.  Philosophical Transactions of the Royal Society of London: Biological Sciences 353: 1521–1552.
 Lee, M.S.Y., Scanlon, J.D.  2002.  Snake phylogeny based on osteology, soft anatomy and behaviour.  Biological Reviews 77: 333–401.
  et al. 2003 "The Anatomy and Relationships of Haasiophis terrasanctus, a Fossil Snake with Well-Developed Hind Limbs from the Mid-Cretaceous of the Middle East" Journal of Paleontology 77(3):536-558
 Scanlon, J.D., Lee, M.S.Y., Caldwell, M.W. and Shine, R.  1999.  Paleoecology of the primitive snake Pachyrhachis.  Historical Biology 13: 127–152.

External links
Picture
The Cenomanian: stage of hindlimbed snakes

Cretaceous snakes
Late Cretaceous reptiles of Asia
Transitional fossils
Fossil taxa described in 1979
Fossils of Palestine